Munch Man (inconsistently written in the manual as Munchman) is a video game written by Jim Dramis for the TI-99/4A home computer and published as a cartridge by Texas Instruments in 1982. Based on Namco's Pac-Man, it includes several variations that alter gameplay. Instead of emptying the maze of dots, Munch Man leaves a chain-like pattern as it moves, and the goal is to fill the entire maze. Dramis later wrote Parsec for the TI-99/4A.

Plot
From the front of the manual:

Gameplay 

The player controls Munch Man using either the keyboard or joystick. Like Pac-Man, the goal of a level is to visit every part of the maze, but instead of eating dots the player fills the maze with a chain pattern. Four Hoonos (the equivalent of Pac-Man ghosts) attempt to thwart Munch Man's efforts to complete his mission. However, Munch Man always has his "Energizer" (the equivalent of a Pac-Man power pill) which gives Munch Man the ability to devour the Hoonos. The game ends when the player's lives are depleted. 

The shape of the Hoonos changes with each level, but their colors remain consistent. Each level has Hoonos colored red, yellow, blue, and purple. There are 20 unique sets of Hoonos. Beginning with level 21, the Hoonos recycle shape.

In level 20, 40, and 60, the maze is invisible and there are no chains.  Instead, Munch Man must eat all the TI logos in the invisible maze.  This gives the odd effect of showcasing the maze at first, but slowly hiding the maze as the player removes the indications of the maze paths by eating the TI logos.

Scoring 
10 points are earned for every link of the chain made.

70 points are awarded for each of the four Texas-shaped energizers eaten per level.

100 points are given for the first Hoono munched, 200 for the second, 400 for the third, and 800 for the fourth.

For every 10,000 points earned, an extra Munch Man is awarded.

Development
Originally, Munch Man gobbled dots and power-pills, just like Pac-Man. However, TI decided to avoid the risk of a lawsuit to replace the dots with laying down a chain and power pellets were changed out for TI logos.

Reception

References 

1982 video games
Pac-Man clones
TI-99/4A games
Video games developed in the United States
Texas Instruments games